The Battle of Mirebeau was a battle in 1202 between the House of Lusignan-Breton alliance and the Kingdom of England. King John of England successfully smashed the Lusignan army by surprise.

Background 

After Richard I's death on 6 April 1199 there were two potential claimants to the Angevin throne: John, whose claim rested on being the sole surviving son of Henry II, and Arthur I of Brittany, who held a claim as the son of Geoffrey, John's elder brother. Richard appeared to have started to recognise John as his legitimate heir in the final years before his death, but the matter was not clear-cut and medieval law gave little guidance as to how the competing claims should be decided. With Norman law favouring John as the only surviving son of Henry II and Angevin law favouring Arthur as the heir of Henry's elder son, the matter rapidly became an open conflict. John was supported by the bulk of the English and Norman nobility and was crowned at Westminster Abbey,  backed by his mother, Eleanor of Aquitaine. Arthur was supported by the majority of the Breton, Maine and Anjou nobles, and received the support of Philip II of France, who remained committed to breaking up the Angevin territories on the continent. With Arthur's army pressing up the Loire valley towards Angers and Philip's forces moving down the valley towards Tours, John's continental empire was in danger of being cut in two.

Warfare in Normandy at the time was shaped by the defensive potential of castles and the increasing costs of conducting campaigns. The Norman frontiers had limited natural defences but were heavily reinforced with castles, such as Château Gaillard, at strategic points, built and maintained at considerable expense. It was difficult for a commander to advance far into fresh territory without having secured his lines of communication by capturing these fortifications, which slowed the progress of any attack. Armies of the period could be formed from either feudal or mercenary forces. Feudal levies could only be raised for a fixed length of time before they returned home, forcing an end to a campaign; mercenary forces, often called Brabançons after the Duchy of Brabant but actually recruited from across northern Europe, could operate all year long and provide a commander with more strategic options to pursue a campaign, but cost much more than equivalent feudal forces. As a result, commanders of the period were increasing drawing on larger numbers of mercenaries.

After his coronation, John moved south into France with military forces and adopted a defensive posture along the eastern and southern Normandy borders. Both sides paused for desultory negotiations before the war recommenced; John's position was now stronger, thanks to confirmation that Count Baldwin IX of Flanders and Renaud of Boulogne had renewed the anti-French alliances they had previously agreed to with Richard. The powerful Anjou nobleman William de Roches was persuaded to switch sides from Arthur to John; suddenly the balance seemed to be tipping away from Philip and Arthur in favour of John. Neither side was keen to continue the conflict, and following a papal truce the two leaders met in January 1200 to negotiate possible terms for peace. From John's perspective, what then followed represented an opportunity to stabilise control over his continental possessions and produce a lasting peace with Philip in Paris. John and Philip negotiated the May 1200 Treaty of Le Goulet; by this treaty, Philip recognised John as the rightful heir to Richard in respect to his French possessions, temporarily abandoning the wider claims of his client, Arthur. John, in turn, abandoned Richard's former policy of containing Philip through alliances with Flanders and Boulogne, and accepted Philip's right as the legitimate feudal overlord of John's lands in France. John's policy earned him the disrespectful title of "John Softsword" from some English chroniclers, who contrasted his behaviour with his more aggressive brother, Richard.

The new peace would only last for two years; war recommenced in the aftermath of John's decision in August 1200 to marry Isabella of Angoulême. In order to remarry, John first needed to abandon Isabel, Countess of Gloucester, his first wife; John accomplished this by arguing that he had failed to get the necessary papal permission to marry Isabel in the first place – as a cousin, John could not have legally wed her without this. It remains unclear why John chose to marry Isabella of Angoulême. Contemporary chroniclers argued that John had fallen deeply in love with Isabella, and John may have been motivated by desire for an apparently beautiful, if rather young, girl. On the other hand, the Angoumois lands that came with Isabella were strategically vital to John: by marrying Isabella, John was acquiring a key land route between Poitou and Gascony, which significantly strengthened his grip on Aquitaine.

Isabella was, however, already engaged to Hugh de Lusignan, an important member of a key Poitou noble family and brother of Raoul de Lusignan, the Count of Eu, who possessed lands along the sensitive eastern Normandy border. Just as John stood to benefit strategically from marrying Isabella, so the marriage threatened the interests of the Lusignans, whose own lands currently provided the key route for royal goods and troops across Aquitaine. Rather than negotiating some form of compensation, John treated Hugh "with contempt"; this resulted in a Lusignan uprising that was promptly crushed by John, who also intervened to suppress Raoul in Normandy.

Although John was the Count of Poitou and therefore the rightful feudal lord over the Lusignans, they could legitimately appeal John's actions in France to his own feudal lord, Philip. Hugh did exactly this in 1201 and Philip summoned John to attend court in Paris in 1202, citing the Le Goulet treaty to strengthen his case. John was unwilling to weaken his authority in western France in this way. He argued that he need not attend Philip's court because of his special status as the Duke of Normandy, who was exempt by feudal tradition from being called to the French court. Philip argued that he was summoning John not as the Duke of Normandy, but as the Count of Poitou, which carried no such special status. When John still refused to come, Philip declared John in breach of his feudal responsibilities, reassigned all of John's lands that fell under the French crown to Arthur – with the exception of Normandy, which he took back for himself – and began a fresh war against John.

Battle 
John initially adopted a defensive posture similar to that of 1199: avoiding open battle and carefully defending his key castles. John's operations became more chaotic as the campaign progressed, and Philip began to make steady progress in the east. John became aware in July that Arthur's forces were threatening his mother, Eleanor, at Mirebeau Castle. Accompanied by William de Roches, his seneschal in Anjou, he swung his mercenary army rapidly south to protect her. His forces caught Arthur by surprise and captured the entire rebel leadership at the battle of Mirebeau. It was also probable that Eleanor, elder sister of Arthur, also with a better claim to England, was captured in the battle as well. With his southern flank weakening, Philip was forced to withdraw in the east and turn south himself to contain John's army.

Aftermath 
Though John defeated the Lusignans, he was still contested by Philip II of France. At some indeterminate point soon afterwards, it is presumed that Arthur was murdered. With Eleanor, Fair Maid of Brittany strictly imprisoned in England, John had secured his throne, but his controversial removal of Arthur turned the support of local counts against him. For the next two years, John dealt so arrogantly with the counts of Anjou and Poitou that large numbers switched sides to support Philip II, who continued to incrementally advance from one hilltop castle to the next in Normandy. This culminated in the Siege of Château Gaillard, which ended in 1204. John's relief attempts were defeated, the castle fell, and his position in France was destroyed. 

The captivity of Eleanor prevented her from succeeding Brittany, ending the line of succession of Geoffrey Plantagenet; the effective successor was Alix half-sister of Arthur from House of Thouars.

References 

Mirebeau 1202
History of Nord (French department)
Mirebeau 1202
Mirebeau 1202
Philip II of France
John, King of England